Farida Yasmin (born 1 June 1963) is a Bangladeshi journalist,  and President of Jatiya Press Club. She is a senior journalist of The Daily Ittefaq and former general secretary of Bangladesh National Press Club. In 2017 she was elected the first female general secretary of Bangladesh Press Club. She was the former joint secretary of National Press Club.

Early life and education
Her father is Shakhawar Hossain Bhuiyan and her mother is Jahanara Hossain. She was the student of Shibpur Girls High School, Narsingdi. She passed SSC exam from Shibpur Girls High School and HSC exam from Eden Mohila College. Yasmin completed masters from University of Dhaka.

Career
Yasmin was elected Joint secretary of the National Press Club of Bangladesh in 2011, and 2012. In 2013 she announced convicted war criminals Abdul Quader Molla and Muhammad Kamaruzzamann were expelled from the press club, saying "The unanimous decision came at the JPC managing committee meeting,". She is the joint secretary of South Asian Women's Media Forum and was a founding member of the forum. She spoke for keeping the age of marriage in Bangladesh at 18 for women.

In 2016, Yasmin was made the vice-president of Dhaka University Mass Communication and Journalism Alumni Association. She was elected General Secretary of Jatiya Press Club on 1 January 2017, she was first female General Secretary of the Jatiya Press Club. She was re-elected to the post of General Secretary of the Jatiya Press Club on 18 December 2018. She is the editor and publisher of womeneye24.com. On 31 December 2020, she was elected president of Jatiya Press Club, the first woman to be elected president.

Published books
 Basha Andolon o nari, 2005
 Ujjal Narir Mukhomukhi, 2005
 Itehasher Aynay Bangabandhu, 2017

Personal life
Yasmin is married to journalist Naem Nizam since 1990. They have one son named Mahir Abrar and one daughter named Nujhat Purnata.

References

External links

1963 births
Living people
Bangladeshi women journalists
University of Dhaka alumni
Bangladeshi newspaper editors
Bangladeshi women writers
People from Narsingdi District
Eden Mohila College alumni